The story of Mary of Bethezuba is a story of cannibalism told by Josephus in his “Jewish War” (VI,193) which occurred as a consequence of famine and starvation during the siege of Jerusalem in August AD 70 by Roman legions commanded by Titus. The tale is only one account of the horrors suffered at Jerusalem in the summer of 70.

Josephus relates that there was a Mary, daughter of Eleazar originally from the village of Bethezuba in the district of Perea, east of the Jordan River, who had previously fled to Jerusalem. Distinguished in family and fortune, her property, treasures and food had been plundered by the Jewish defenders of the city during the siege.  Famine was “eating her heart out, and rage consuming her still faster”.  Maddened by hunger she took the infant at her breast and said to him: “Poor little mite! In war, famine, and civil strife why should I keep you alive? With the Romans there is only slavery and that only if alive when they come; but famine is forestalling slavery, and the partisans are crueler than either. Come you must be food for me, to the partisans an avenging spirit, and to the world a tale, the only thing left to fill up the measure of Jewish misery”.  And in “defiance to all natural feeling” she killed her son, then roasted him and ate one half, hiding the rest.

Almost immediately the rebels appeared (“sniffing the unholy smell”) and threatened to kill her on the spot unless she revealed what she had prepared. As she uncovered what was left of the child she offered them a share. They left her in horror and the “entire city could not stop thinking of this crime and abomination”.  When the news reached the Romans, “some refused to believe, some were distressed but on most the effect was to add enormously to their detestation” of the enemy at hand. Titus disclaimed all responsibility as he had repeatedly offered peace and amnesty for surrender.

References 

 
 Josephus. The Jewish War. Penguin Books, Harmondworth, Middlesex, England, 1981.
 Maier, Paul L. Josephus: The Essential Writings. Kregel Publications, Grand Rapids, MI, 1988.

1st-century women